Serianthes rurutensis is a species of flowering plant in the family Fabaceae. It is found only in French Polynesia.

References

rurutensis
Flora of the Tubuai Islands
Critically endangered plants
Taxonomy articles created by Polbot